Henry Bruen (26 July 1856 – 26 December 1927) was an Irish first-class cricketer and British Army officer.

The son of the politician Henry Bruen and his wife, Mary Margaret Conolly, he was born at the family estate Oak Park in County Carlow. He was educated in England at Harrow School, before attending the Royal Military Academy, Woolwich. He graduated from Woolwich in February 1877, entering into the Royal Artillery with the temporary rank of lieutenant. His commission to lieutenant was made permanent in March 1878. Bruen later toured North America in September 1885 with a team formed by the Devon amateur E. J. Sanders, making two first-class appearances on the tour against the Gentlemen of Philadelphia at Germantown. He met with success in his second first-class match of the tour, taking figures of 6 for 54 with the ball in the Gentlemen of Philadelphia second-innings. The following year he married Agnes Mary MacMorrough Kavanagh, the daughter of Arthur MacMurrough Kavanagh, with the couple having one son. In the same year he served as the High Sheriff of Carlow, and later served as the High Sheriff of Wexford in 1909. Bruen died at Oak Park in December 1927.

References

External links

1856 births
1927 deaths
People from County Carlow
People educated at Harrow School
Graduates of the Royal Military Academy, Woolwich
Royal Artillery officers
Irish cricketers
E. J. Sanders' XI cricketers
High Sheriffs of Carlow
High Sheriffs of Wexford